Charles A. Zimmermann (1861 – 16 January 1916) was an American composer of marches and popular music. A graduate of the Peabody Conservatory of Music in Baltimore, he was appointed bandmaster at the United States Naval Academy in 1887 at the age of 26. He served as the academy's bandmaster until his death from a brain hemorrhage in 1916. He is buried at the Naval Academy cemetery.

Zimmermann composed his most famous march, "Anchors Aweigh", in 1906 when he was a lieutenant in the United States Navy. The lyrics were written by Alfred Hart Miles, a midshipman. The march was intended from the beginning to serve as a rousing tune for football games. The familiar strain is actually the trio (third movement) of the larger work. Zimmermann also composed numerous songs for the 1902 stage play The Wizard of Oz.

List of compositions

with Frank Keesee:
Only You (Sir Dashemoff Daily)
with Mr. Hollister:
When the Heart is Sad (Sir Dashemoff Daily)
with Vincent Bryan:
Marching Thro' Georgia (Scarecrow and Tin Woodman)
Sitting Bull (Scarecrow)
Football (Scarecrow and Tin Woodman)
Marching Through Port Arthur (Scarecrow and Tin Woodman)

Bibliography
Holsinger, M. Paul, ed. (1999). War and American Popular Culture: A Historical Encyclopedia. Westport: Greenwood Press.
Ravitch, Diane, ed. (2000). The American Reader. New York: Harper Collins.

External links
 Biography at www.usna.edu
 US Navy page: "Anchors Aweigh"
 

1861 births
1916 deaths
American people of German descent
American male composers
American composers
Zimmermann, Charles
Peabody Institute alumni
Place of birth missing